Instruments used specially in urology are as follows:

Instrument list

See also
List of surgical instruments
Instruments used in internal medicine

References 

Medical equipment
Urologic procedures